The Gorgon Cult is the third studio album by the Italian symphonic black metal band Stormlord. Melodic riffs, high speed double bass intensive drumming, extensive use of keyboards and orchestral parts form the backbone of the record. Also this time band has incorporated some operatic female vocals alongside vocalist Cristiano Borchi who carries on with his style of coupling high pitched screeches with guttural vocals. Clean vocals are also featured on some parts of the album.

Track listing
All songs written by Francesco Bucci, except where noted.
 "The Torchbearer" (Simone Scazzocchio) – 1:00
 "Dance of Hecate" – 5:09
 "Wurdulak" – 4:11
 "Under the Boards" – 5:44
 "The Oath of the Legion" – 4:53
 "The Gorgon Cult" – 4:49
 "Memories of Lemuria" (Simone Scazzocchio) – 3:41 
 "Medusa's Coil" – 5:19
 "Moonchild" (Bruce Dickinson, Steve Harris) – 5:02
 "Nightbreed" (Damnagoras) – 5:56

Personnel
Cristiano Borchi - vocals
Pierangelo Giglioni - Guitar
Giampaolo Caprino - Guitar
Francesco Bucci - Bass
Simone Scazzocchio - keyboards
David Folchitto - drums

2004 albums
Stormlord (band) albums
Scarlet Records albums
Lemuria (continent)
Albums with cover art by Jean-Pascal Fournier